Fairview Range may refer to:

 Fairview Range (Churchill County) in Churchill County, Nevada, USA
 Fairview Range (Lincoln County) in Lincoln County, Nevada, USA